Ladies Must Dress is a 1927 American silent romantic comedy film directed by Victor Heerman and starring Virginia Valli, Lawrence Gray and Hallam Cooley. It marked the screen debut of the future star Nancy Carroll.

Cast
 Virginia Valli as Eve  
 Lawrence Gray as Joe  
 Hallam Cooley as Art  
 Nancy Carroll as Mazie  
 Earle Foxe as George Ward, Jr  
 Clarence Wilson as Office Manager  
 William H. Tooker as Mr. Ward, Sr

References

Bibliography
 Solomon, Aubrey. The Fox Film Corporation, 1915-1935: A History and Filmography. McFarland, 2011.

External links

1927 films
1927 romantic comedy films
American romantic comedy films
Films directed by Victor Heerman
American silent feature films
Fox Film films
American black-and-white films
1920s English-language films
1920s American films
Silent romantic comedy films
Silent American comedy films